The Chicago Building or Chicago Savings Bank Building is an early skyscraper, built in 1904–1905. It is located at 7 W. Madison Street in Chicago. Designed by the architecture firm Holabird & Roche, it is an early and highly visible example of the Chicago school of architecture.

The building's features characterize this style through the use of large "Chicago windows", metal frame construction, distinctive bays, and terra cotta cladding. The combination of the north side projecting bay windows, and the east side rectangular "Chicago windows" with movable sashes is representative of the two typical Chicago school window types. The building is prominently located on the southwest corner of State Street and Madison Street, with visibility increased by an offset in the alignment of State Street.

The building is a critical component of a grouping of significant structures, including Carson Pirie Scott and the former Mandel Brothers Store, at what was once labeled the "World's Busiest Corner". The building was designated a Chicago landmark on March 26, 1996. In 1997, it was converted to a dormitory for the School of the Art Institute of Chicago. The corner of the 3rd floor of the Chicago Building contains the cornerstone of Chicago. It is the 0-0 degree point of the city, and is the location from which all addresses in Chicago begin.

Notes

Commercial buildings completed in 1905
Commercial buildings on the National Register of Historic Places in Chicago
Residential skyscrapers in Chicago
Chicago school architecture in Illinois
1905 establishments in Illinois
Chicago Landmarks